Junathaen D. "Nate" Watson Jr. (born October 19, 1998) is an American college basketball player for ERA Nymburk of the National Basketball League.

High school career
Watson played basketball for Capitol Christian Academy in Upper Marlboro, Maryland before moving to Bishop O'Connell High School in Arlington, Virginia. His transfer was hindered by a financial dispute involving his former school, causing him to miss three days of school. At Bishop O'Connell, Watson was a two-time First Team All-Washington Catholic Athletic Conference selection. He competed for DC Premier on the Amateur Athletic Union circuit. A consensus four-star recruit, he committed to playing college basketball for Providence over offers from Maryland, NC State and Miami (Florida).

College career
As a freshman at Providence, Watson averaged 6.8 points and 1.9 rebounds per game and was named to the Big East All-Freshman Team. In his sophomore season, he averaged 11.7 points and 5.2 rebounds per game. He missed the beginning of his junior season with a knee injury, averaging nine points and 4.6 rebounds per game.
Watson assumed a leading role in his senior season. On February 6, 2021, he recorded a career-high 30 points and eight rebounds in a 92–81 loss to St. John's. As a senior, Watson averaged 16.9 points and 6.7 rebounds per game, earning Second Team All-Big East honors. He opted to return to Providence for a fifth season, using an extra year of eligibility granted due to the COVID-19 pandemic. Watson was again named to the Second Team All-Big East.

Professional career
On August 3, 2022, he has signed with ERA Nymburk of the National Basketball League.

National team career
Watson represented the United States at the 2019 Pan American Games in Peru, helping his team win the bronze medal.

Career statistics

College

|-
| style="text-align:left;"| 2017–18
| style="text-align:left;"| Providence
| 35 || 9 || 13.8 || .595 || – || .696 || 1.9 || .1 || .2 || .7 || 6.8
|-
| style="text-align:left;"| 2018–19
| style="text-align:left;"| Providence
| 34 || 20 || 23.5 || .590 || .000 || .652 || 5.2 || .4 || .3 || .7 || 11.7
|-
| style="text-align:left;"| 2019–20
| style="text-align:left;"| Providence
| 27 || 13 || 18.9 || .511 || – || .565 || 4.6 || .5 || .6 || .6 || 9.0
|-
| style="text-align:left;"| 2020–21
| style="text-align:left;"| Providence
| 26 || 26 || 32.3 || .602 || – || .627 || 6.7 || .7 || .3 || 1.0 || 16.9
|-
| style="text-align:left;"| 2021–22
| style="text-align:left;"| Providence
| 33 || 33 || 28.0 || .548 || – || .583 || 5.2 || .5 || .3 || .7 || 13.3
|- class="sortbottom"
| style="text-align:center;" colspan="2"| Career
| 155 || 101 || 22.9 || .570 || .000 || .623 || 4.6 || .4 || .3 || .7 || 11.3

References

External links
Providence Friars bio

1998 births
Living people
American men's basketball players
Basketball players at the 2019 Pan American Games
Basketball players from Virginia
Centers (basketball)
Medalists at the 2019 Pan American Games
Pan American Games bronze medalists for the United States
Pan American Games medalists in basketball
Providence Friars men's basketball players
Sportspeople from Portsmouth, Virginia
United States men's national basketball team players